Claylick is a former town in Licking County, in the U.S. state of Ohio. The GNIS classifies it as a populated place.

History
The community took its name from nearby Clay Lick Creek. A post office called Clay Lick was established in 1852, and remained in operation until 1918. Claylick once had a mill and a store.

References

Geography of Licking County, Ohio
1852 establishments in Ohio
Populated places established in 1852